The Kharasch–Sosnovsky reaction is the radical oxidation of an allylic alkene to a allylic alcohol using a copper catalyst and a peroxy ester (e.g. tert-Butyl peroxybenzoate) or a peroxide. Chiral ligands can be used to render the reaction asymmetric, constructing chiral C–O bonds via C–H bond activation. This is notable as asymmetric addition to allylic groups tends to be difficult due to the transition state being highly symmetric. The reaction is named after Morris S. Kharasch and George Sosnovsky who first reported it in 1958.

Modifications
Substituted oxazolines and thiazolines can be oxidized to the corresponding oxazoles and thiazoles via a modification of the classic reaction.

Mechanism 
The mechanism is believed to involve radical intermediates and copper in the I, II and III oxidation states, via the following steps:

Cu(I) + BzO–OtBu → Cu(II)–OBz + tBuO• 

tBuO• + CH2=CH–CH2R → tBuOH + CH2=CH–CHR• 

CH2=CH–CHR• + Cu(II)–OBz → CH2=CH–CHR–Cu(III)–OBz 

CH2=CH–CHR–Cu(III)–OBz → CH2=CH–CHR(OBz) + Cu(I)

The last step, a reductive elimination of an organocopper(III) intermediate to regenerate the Cu(I) catalyst and form the product, is proposed to take place via a seven-membered ring transition state.

References

Catalysis
Name reactions
Carbon-heteroatom bond forming reactions